The Maltese Corso, also known as the Corto Maltese, was a long-standing naval operation from 1530 to 1798 conducted by the Knights Hospitaller based on the Island of Malta, waged against the Ottoman Empire's navy and merchant shipping 
on the coast of North Africa, and (as the Ottoman influence weakened) against the semi-independent Ottoman vassals, the Deylik of Algiers, the Eyalet of Tripoli, the Eyalet of Tunis, and the Barbary pirates. The Corso reached its peak intensity in the years from 1660 to 1675, and slowly waned during the following decades, eventually reduced to only seven ships in 1724, before finally coming to an end with Malta's capitulation to Napoleon in June 1798.

Although the Maltese Corso is not well known, it was one of the main factors in the economic decline of the Islamic World, and rise of European military dominance at sea, which would have a pronounced impact across the globe facilitating European commerce and colonization. This legacy makes the Maltese Corso one of the most pivotal events in history.

References 

Military history of Malta